Kočna is a settlement in the Municipality of Jesenice in the Upper Carniola region of Slovenia.

Name
Kočna is a relatively common toponym in Slovenia. It is derived from the Slovene common noun kočna 'cirque' and originally refers to a local geographical feature.

Mass grave
Kočna is the site of a mass grave from the period immediately after the Second World War. The Kočna Mass Grave, also known as the Poljane nad Jesenicami Mass Grave, is located southeast of the settlement, a few dozen meters from a dirt road. One of the intended victims was able to escape.

Cultural heritage
Excavations in 1982 at the Jamnik Rock Shelter east of the settlement revealed artifacts from the Mesolithic era. The finds included a bone harpoon blade.

References

External links
Kočna on Geopedia

Populated places in the Municipality of Jesenice